Mission: Impossible – Dead Reckoning Part One is an upcoming American action spy film written, produced, and directed by Christopher McQuarrie. It is the sequel to Mission: Impossible – Fallout (2018) and is the seventh and penultimate installment in the Mission: Impossible film series. The film stars Tom Cruise, Ving Rhames, Simon Pegg, Rebecca Ferguson, Vanessa Kirby, Hayley Atwell, Shea Whigham, Pom Klementieff, Esai Morales, Rob Delaney, Henry Czerny, and Cary Elwes.

In January 2019, Cruise announced that the seventh and eighth Mission: Impossible films would be shot back-to-back with McQuarrie writing and directing both films for 2021, and 2022, releases. In February 2021, Paramount scuttled that plan, and the film experienced numerous delays due to the COVID-19 pandemic and production shutdowns before landing a 2023 release date.  Cast members were announced from September 2019 to March 2021. Lorne Balfe, who composed the musical score for Fallout, returned to score the film. Filming began in February 2020 and lasted until September 2021. Unlike the previous three films, Bad Robot Productions will not be involved with the film.

Mission: Impossible – Dead Reckoning Part One is scheduled for release in the United States on July 14, 2023, by Paramount Pictures. The sequel, Dead Reckoning Part Two, is to be released on June 28, 2024.

Cast 
 Tom Cruise as Ethan Hunt, an IMF agent and leader of a team of operatives.
Ving Rhames as Luther Stickell, an IMF computer technician, a member of Hunt's team, and his closest friend.
 Simon Pegg as Benji Dunn, an IMF technical field agent and a member of Hunt's team.
 Rebecca Ferguson as Ilsa Faust, a former MI6 agent who allied with Hunt's team during Mission: Impossible – Rogue Nation (2015) and Mission: Impossible – Fallout (2018).
 Vanessa Kirby as Alanna Mitsopolis, a black-market arms dealer also known as the White Widow. Daughter of "Max" from the first film.
Hayley Atwell as Grace. Christopher McQuarrie described Atwell's character as a "destructive force of nature", while Atwell explained that her character's loyalties are "somewhat ambiguous".
 Shea Whigham as Jasper Briggs.
 Esai Morales as the film's primary antagonist.
 Henry Czerny as Eugene Kittridge, the former director of the IMF last seen in Mission: Impossible (1996).
 Frederick Schmidt as Zola Mitsopolis, Alanna's brother.

Pom Klementieff, Rob Delaney, Cary Elwes, Indira Varma, Mark Gatiss, Charles Parnell, Greg Davis, Marcin Dorociński, Lampros Kalfuntzos, Mariela Garriga, and Antonio Bustorff have been cast in undisclosed roles.

Production

Announcement and casting 
On January 14, 2019, Cruise announced that the seventh and eighth Mission: Impossible films would be shot back-to-back with McQuarrie writing and directing both films for July 23, 2021, and August 5, 2022, releases.

In February 2021, Paramount scuttled that plan, but Ferguson confirmed her return for the seventh installment. In September 2019, McQuarrie announced on Instagram that Hayley Atwell had joined the cast. In September 2019, Pom Klementieff joined the cast of both the seventh and eighth films. In December 2019, Simon Pegg confirmed his return for the film, with Shea Whigham cast of both films. Nicholas Hoult was cast in a role in January 2020, along with the addition of Henry Czerny, reprising his role as Eugene Kittridge for the first time since the 1996 film. Vanessa Kirby also announced she was returning for both films. In May 2020, it was reported that Esai Morales would replace Hoult as the villain in both films due to scheduling conflicts.

Angela Bassett confirmed that she would return as Erika Sloane in December 2020, but was later removed from the film due to COVID-19 travel restrictions. In March 2021, McQuarrie revealed on Instagram that Rob Delaney, Charles Parnell, Indira Varma, Mark Gatiss and Cary Elwes had joined the cast. That same day, Greg Davis was also confirmed to have joined the cast.

Filming and COVID-19 shutdown 
Under the working title Libra, filming was scheduled to begin on February 20, 2020, in Venice, set up to last for three weeks before moving to Rome in mid-March for 40 days, but due to the COVID-19 pandemic in Italy, production in the country was halted. Three weeks later, stunt rehearsals began in Surrey, England, just before a hiatus. On July 6, 2020, after another hiatus, crew arriving in the UK were given permission to begin filming without going through the mandatory 14-day quarantine. The set was located at Warner Bros Studios, Leavesden in Hertfordshire.

The following month, similar permission was granted for filming in Møre og Romsdal, Norway. That same month, a large fire broke out on a motorcycle stunt rig in Oxfordshire. The scene had taken six weeks to prepare and was "among one of the most expensive ever filmed in the U.K." No one was hurt in the incident.

Filming began on September 6, 2020, when McQuarrie started to publish pictures from the sets on Instagram. In October 2020, across Norway, when the previous installment was filmed in Preikestolen, including the municipalities of Stranda and Rauma, with Cruise seen filming an action scene with Esai Morales atop a train. On October 26, 2020, production was halted in Italy after 12 people tested positive for COVID-19 on set. Filming resumed a week later.

In December 2020, during filming in London, an audio recording of Cruise shouting at two production crew members for not following the COVID-19 rules on set was released online. Cruise was likened to his character Les Grossman from the 2008 film Tropic Thunder as a result. The response from the general public and that of many celebrities was supportive, suggesting that his tone and seriousness were warranted given the extreme circumstances and burden of ensuring production not be halted again. On December 28, 2020, Variety reported that the film would conclude principal photography at Longcross Film Studios in the United Kingdom, with production shifting from Warner Bros. Studios, Leavesden. In Longcross, which is in Surrey in south-east England, productions were allowed to continue under strict COVID-19 protocols. In February 2021, filming concluded in the Middle East and the crew would return to London for "finishing touches".

On April 20, 2021, filming commenced in the small village of Levisham, North Yorkshire, North Yorkshire Moors Railway, for a sequence set in the Alps in Switzerland with a train going  an hour through a bridge being blown up, as a reference to the climactic train wreck scene in the 1926 silent film The General. In August 2021, filming commenced in Birmingham at the city's Grand Central shopping centre, with Cruise and Atwell spotted by onlookers. In September 2021, the film's gaffer Martin Smith confirmed on Instagram that principal photography had officially wrapped.

Polish bridge controversy 
During the pre-production in late 2019, the Swiss government refused to authorize any explosions for the train sequence in the Alps; as a result, the Skydance Media production team embarked on location scoutings in different countries to find an unwanted railway bridge. Among those asked to help with staging a "full-scale train crash" was Polish-American film producer Andrew Eksner. In November 2019, the Polish State Railways proposed Eksner use a 151-meter (492 ft) long, 1908 German-era riveted truss bridge on Lake Pilchowickie  [pl; es], in the Jelenia Góra Valley, in Lower Silesia. In December 2019, Paramount Pictures producers including McQuarrie landed in southern Poland, accompanied in deep secrecy by officers of the Polish engineering troops. McQuarrie documented the visit on Instagram.

Officially opened in 1912 by Wilhelm II, the proposed bridge survived World War II mostly intact, and was used by trains until 2016. Despite publicly praising the bridge as "extremely valuable," an expert misrepresented conclusions of a commissioned report, that instead of renovating, it would be best to demolish the bridge and build a new one. In March 2020, after the rejected Eksner spread the information, local authorities and museum officials were appalled by the producers' intention to physically destroy the bridge, instead of using CGI effects. The filmmakers and government officials said the bridge was devastated and intended for demolition.

By July 2020, history and railway enthusiasts, scientists and filmmakers protested, along with the regional Monuments Heritage Office, members of Polish parliament, and the International Committee for the Conservation of the Industrial Heritage. Activists and NGOs launched a petition against the destruction. And as it was long registered provincially, and being added into Poland's national Registry of Cultural Property, the Ministry of Culture and National Heritage confirmed it was pushing the bridge to play in the movie, with a "small section" to be demolished onset, before revitalizing the related local heritage railway line altogether. Following the backlash, the General Conservator of Monuments assured "there was no question" of destroying the bridge.

In August 2020, as the story turned international, McQuarrie said there was never a plan to blow up the bridge, and that only unsafe and partially damaged portions could have been destroyed, which allegedly needed to be rebuilt, concluding: "To open up the area to tourism, the bridge needed to go." He later added that "there was no disrespect intended". The production company did not pledge to cover construction costs of a potential new bridge, nor the renovation of the historic one. Eventually, cultural property registration procedures for the Lake Pilchowickie bridge were finalized, effectively preventing it from any damage. In May 2021, Eksner sued the Paramount production crew including McQuarrie and Cruise for breach of contract.

Ultimately, filming of the train wreck scene was expected to take place between April and June 2021, in the Peak District National Park in Stoney Middleton, on a constructed set in a disused quarry, with a railway line and part of a bridge over the cliff edge. After two weeks of suspended filming, the scene was filmed on August 20, when a mockup Britannia Class locomotive was propelled off the cliff into the quarry.

Post-production
Industrial Light & Magic returns to provide the visual effects for the film after doing so for the first film, Mission: Impossible III, and Mission: Impossible – Ghost Protocol, with Blind LTD, Clear Angle Studios, and Halon Entertainment being the additional vendors for the film.

Music 
In early May 2020, the composer Lorne Balfe was confirmed to be returning to compose the score for the seventh and eighth Mission: Impossible films, after scoring the sixth. Balfe's music from the teaser trailer was digitally released by Paramount Music on June 23, 2022 as a single.

Marketing 

A trailer for the film debuted exclusively at CinemaCon on April 28, 2022, including an introduction by Tom Cruise filmed while he was flying in a biplane. The trailer was leaked to social media on May 21, 2022, and was officially released online on May 23, 2022. The CinemaCon introduction was released officially on September 8, 2022.

Release 
Mission: Impossible – Dead Reckoning Part One is scheduled to be released on July 14, 2023, in both regular formats and in IMAX. It was previously set to be released on July 23, 2021, November 19, 2021, May 27, 2022 and September 30, 2022, before being delayed to its current date due to the COVID-19 pandemic and production shutdowns it caused. Its November and May release dates were given to Top Gun: Maverick, another film starring Cruise.

Sequel 

A direct sequel has been filmed and is scheduled to be released on June 28, 2024, after being delayed due to the COVID-19 pandemic. It was announced that both films will be a send-off to Ethan Hunt.

References

External links 
 
 

2023 action films
2020s spy films
American sequel films
American spy action films
Bad Robot Productions films
Films based on television series
Films directed by Christopher McQuarrie
Films produced by J. J. Abrams
Films produced by Tom Cruise
Films scored by Lorne Balfe
Films shot in Abu Dhabi
Films shot in Italy
Films shot in Rome
Films shot in Venice
Films shot in Norway
Films shot in Surrey
Films shot at Warner Bros. Studios, Leavesden
Films with screenplays by Christopher McQuarrie
Mission: Impossible (film series)
Skydance Media films
Paramount Pictures films
Upcoming sequel films
Film productions suspended due to the COVID-19 pandemic
Films postponed due to the COVID-19 pandemic
2020s English-language films
American action thriller films
2020s American films